The 2002 Proximus Diamond Games was a women's professional tennis tournament played on indoor s at the Sportpaleis in Antwerp, Belgium that was part of the Tier II category of the 2002 WTA Tour. It was the inaugural edition of the tournament and was held from 11 February until 17 February 2002. First-seeded Venus Williams won the singles title and earned $93,000 first-prize money.

Finals

Singles
 Venus Williams defeated  Justine Henin, 6–3, 5–7, 6–3

Doubles
 Magdalena Maleeva /  Patty Schnyder defeated  Nathalie Dechy /  Meilen Tu, 6–3, 6–7(3–7), 6–3

External links
 ITF tournament edition details
 Tournament draws

Proximus Diamond Games
Diamond Games
2002 in Belgian tennis
2002 in Belgian women's sport